Qazhyghumar Shabdanuly (born 1925, died 11 February 2011) was a Kazakh Chinese political activist and an author writing in Kazakh language. For more than forty years, Shabdanuly was imprisoned by the People's Republic of China for his political views.

Shabdanuly was born in 1925 in the village of Tansyq in Eastern Kazakhstan, then in the Soviet Union. 
Soon, the family fled from the famine of 1932-1933 to Xinjiang.  
Shabdanuly's problems with Chinese law began during the 1944 Xinjiang uprising. 
During the Cultural Revolution Shabdanuly participated in a nationalist Kirghiz-Kazakh Society. 
In 1958 he was arrested and imprisoned for both "left wing" and "ultra right" political activities. 
He was sentenced to 22 years and served if full-time in Tarim camps in Taklamakan Desert. 
Shabdanuly was released in 1980, and in 1982 published the first volume of his opus magnum, Qylmys (Crime), in Ürümqi. 
The second volume was printed in 1985. 
The third and the fourth volumes were already set for printing when Shabdanuly was arrested again. 
This time he was charged with running a Kazakh separatist organization and feeding intelligence to Kazakhstan. 
Shabdanuly was sentenced to thirteen years and again served the full term in Ürümqi jail.

The first independent edition of Shabdanuly's history novel Pana (English: Shelter) was published in Kazakhstan in 2005. Shabdanuly's original arabic writing was transcribed into Cyrillic by Qabdesh Jumadilov. The first complete six-volume edition of Qylmys was printed in Almaty in 2009. In January 2010 it was nominated for Kazakh state prize in literature. The nominator presented Qylmys as "a book about the colonization of the Kazakh territories, which gives a clear picture of what Kazakhs went through under the imperial pressure of China and the Soviet Union". However, the government commissioners stonewalled the proposal and struck the book off the nominations' list.

As of July 2010, Shabdanuly remains under house arrest in Chuguchak. Kazakh nationalist organizations advised president Nursultan Nazarbayev to demand full freedom for Shabdanuly but, as of 2010, limited government efforts brought no result. According to Shabdanuly's daughter Jaynar, who lives in Almaty and is a citizen of Kazakhstan, the Chinese government regularly refused to let Shabdanuly leave the country. He has five surviving adult children, four of them remain in China. According to Jaynar, her mother and her siblings in China are able to travel from China to Kazakhstan and back.

See also 

 Oralman, re-immigration of ethnic Kazakhs to Kazakhstan
 Kazakh exodus from Xinjiang

References 

1925 births
2011 deaths
People from East Kazakhstan Region
Prisoners and detainees of the People's Republic of China
Chinese dissidents
Kazakh-language writers